Chasing Morgan is an American pop punk band from Harford County, Maryland that began early in 2010. They have played alongside many national touring acts and were a catering band for the Vans Warped Tour in 2013 and 2014.

History 
Chasing Morgan was started in early 2010 by Mark Weider and Darin Reagan. Mark and Darin were both juniors in high school at the time.

In 2011 Chasing Morgan won the Ernie Ball Battle of the Bands and got to play on the Ernie Ball stage at Warped Tour in Columbia Maryland.

In July 2012 the band released an EP titled "Battlescars." The Ep was produced by Nik Bruzzese from the band Man Overboard

In June 2013 Chasing Morgan released "Accident Prone: a Collection of Songs" This album features songs taken from old EP's as well as three new songs. Chasing Morgan spent the summer of 2013 as a catering band for Vans Warped Tour and played at the Columbia, Maryland and San Antonio, Texas dates of the tour

In January 2014 the band was featured in season 2 episode 7 of Warped Roadies on Fuse. The episode follows the band as they worked in catering during the 2013 Vans Warped Tour and also shows them playing at the Columbia, Maryland date on the Kevin Says stage.

Chasing Morgan returned to Warped Tour as a catering band in 2014. They played on the Kevin Says stage at the Indianapolis, Indiana; Columbia, Maryland; and Denver, Colorado dates of the tour.

After a few lineup changes in early 2015, the band announced that they would release a 7-song EP called "Remember When" on August 11, 2015.

Chasing Morgan's most recent Instagram post was posted on April 14, 2017, and the band has not been active since.

Members
Current
Mark Weider - lead vocals (2010–2017)
Darin Reagan - guitar (2010–2017)
Hunter Long - guitar (2015–2017)
Jimmy Parris - bass (2015–2017)
Brady Molinaro - drums (2015–2017)
Former
Antonio Hancock - drums (2012–2015)
Ian Rasor - Vocals (2011–2012)
Kevin Ambrosich - rhythm guitar (2010-2014)
Steven Cross - bass (2010-2013)
Brian Lindsey - drums (2010-2012)

Discography

EPs
 The Breakfast Special (2011)
 Stage Dives And High Fives (Acoustic EP - 2012)
 Battlescars (2012)
 Post-Haste (2013)
 Remember When (2015)

Miscellaneous releases
 Accident Prone: a Collection of Songs (2013)

References

Musical groups established in 2010
Pop punk groups from Maryland
2010 establishments in Maryland